Georg Ackermann (born 13 July 1972 in Gernsbach, Baden-Württemberg) is a retired German long jumper.

He won a bronze medal at the 1991 European Junior Championships, finished fourth at the 1995 World Championships and won a silver medal at the 1995 Summer Universiade with a personal best of 8.21 metres. Furthermore, he was a member of the German Olympic Team in Atlanta 1996. He represented the sports clubs LG Karlsruhe and TV Heppenheim, and became German champion in 1993 and 1995.

His personal best jump of 8.21 metres ranks him tenth among German long jumpers, behind Lutz Dombrowski, Frank Paschek, Josef Schwarz, Henry Lauterbach, Marco Delonge, Konstantin Krause, Dietmar Haaf, Ron Beer and Uwe Lange, and equal to Nils Winter and Christian Thomas.

References

1972 births
Living people
People from Gernsbach
Sportspeople from Karlsruhe (region)
German male long jumpers
Athletes (track and field) at the 1996 Summer Olympics
Olympic athletes of Germany
Universiade medalists in athletics (track and field)
Universiade silver medalists for Germany
Medalists at the 1995 Summer Universiade